

Ludwig Heinrich Gaedcke (16 January 1905 – 21 December 1992) was a German general.

Early life
He was the son of a lawyer and grew up in Guben. Following graduation from the Gymnasium in 1924, he joined the 8th Prussian Infantry Regiment as a professional soldier in 1925. He served in a variety of posts until 1935, when he was promoted to captain and admitted to the War Academy for general staff training. Subsequently, he worked as a clerk in the General Staff of the Army.

Second World War
During the Second World War he served as a general staff officer of the 25th Infantry Division from June 1940 to January 1943, and was promoted to major in 1940, lieutenant-colonel in 1943 and colonel in 1943. In February 1943 he was assigned to the reserve of the Army Command and spent much of 1943 teaching at the military academy. He was acting general staff officer of the XXIV Panzer Corps in October–November 1943 and of the XI Army Corps from December 1943 to February 1944. From February to July 1944 he was again assigned to the reserve. In July 1944 he became the deputy of the chief of the general staff of the 4th Army and in August 1944 he became the chief of the general staff of the 6th Army. He was promoted to major general in 1944.

Cold War
From 1948 to 1956 he worked in managerial roles for the companies Bürkle and Bahlsen. Following West German rearmament he joined the Bundeswehr as one of its first general officers in 1956. He commanded the Military Academy of the German Armed Forces from 1957 to 1959 and the Bundeswehr's 11th Panzergrenadier Division from 1959 to 1960. From 1961 to 1965 he was Commanding General of the 3rd Corps in Koblenz. He was promoted to lieutenant general in 1961. Upon his retirement in 1965 he was awarded both the Knight Commander's Cross of the Order of Merit of the Federal Republic of Germany and the French Legion of Merit.

Family
He had four children and was the maternal grandfather of the Secretary-General of the European Commission Martin Selmayr. Martin Selmayr has said that his commitment to the European project in part stems from a trip he took as a teenager with Gaedcke to the battlefields and military cemeteries of Verdun, where Gaedcke told him that his generation had an obligation to prevent any repeat of the mistakes of the past.

Awards and decorations

 German Cross in Gold on 7 March 1942 as Major im Generalstab in the 25. Infanterie-Division (motorized)
 Knight's Cross of the Iron Cross on 7 April 1944 as Oberst im Generalstab and Chief of the Generalstab of XI. Armeekorps
 Knight Commander's Cross of the Order of Merit of the Federal Republic of Germany (1965)
 Legion of Merit (1965)

References

Citations

Bibliography

 
 

1905 births
1992 deaths
People from Guben
People from the Province of Brandenburg
Bundeswehr generals
Major generals of the German Army (Wehrmacht)
Recipients of the Gold German Cross
Recipients of the Knight's Cross of the Iron Cross
German prisoners of war in World War II held by the United States
Lieutenant generals of the German Army
Knights Commander of the Order of Merit of the Federal Republic of Germany
Commandants of the Bundeswehr Command and Staff College
Military personnel from Brandenburg